Michelle Taylor, known professionally as Feminista Jones, is an American social worker and writer who writes about Black feminism. She has developed several social media campaigns and has written for The Washington Post, Salon, Time, and Ebony. Jones authored Reclaiming Our Space: How Black Feminism is Changing the World from the Tweets to the Streets (2019, Beacon Press).

Career
Jones was born and raised in New York City. She is an alumna of the University of Pennsylvania. She stated in an interview that she wishes to fight against poverty because of her personal experience growing up in poverty.

Activism 
Jones previously worked at Witnesses to Hunger, a project of Drexel University's Center for Hunger-Free Communities. In 2013, Jones was selected as a United Nations Foundation Fellow for her social media influence. In 2014, she launched a global anti-street harassment campaign (#YouOKSis) and a national moment of silence protesting police brutality (#NMOS14), both of which received international media attention. #NMOS14, also known as the National Moment of Silence, was used to organize national vigils after the death of Michael Brown. Jones' mantra, "Even if you don't experience something, it doesn't mean it didn't happen" is used to shed light on ignored police violence. She supports Black Lives Matter and other racial justice initiatives, and encourages white people to take part in fighting racism. In an interview, she stated, "I support you, and not only do I support you but I am here with you rolling up my sleeves and asking, what do I need to do?"

In 2014, Jones tweeted about her own experience intervening in an incident of street harassment in New York. Another user, Mia McKenzie, suggested turning the phrase she had used to check in with the woman—"You OK, sis"—into a hashtag campaign designed to raise awareness and encourage people to ask victims of harassment if they need help. Hundreds of people began using the hashtag to report street harassment.

Jones was a featured speaker at the January 21, 2017, Philadelphia Women's March, where she primarily discussed the difference between allies and co-conspirators.

Other work 
In 2015, Jones co-founded and served as general director of the Women's Freedom Conference, the first all-digital conference completely organized by and featuring only women of color. For her work, she was named one of the 2015 "Voices of the Year."

Jones has written articles for the Washington Post, Salon, Time, and Ebony. She has also been regularly featured on Huffington Post Live, has appeared on the Dr. Oz Show and the Exhale Show, and her work has appeared on C-SPAN (2014) and MSNBC (2014).  Jones also advocates for young children as well as the homeless who have psychiatric disabilities.

Jones wrote an article for The Washington Post on May 14, 2015, titled, "Keep Harriet Tubman—and all women—off the $20 bill." She argued it is wrong to place Black women on money, especially Harriet Tubman, due to the historic lack of access to wealth by women and especially women of color. Jones contended that placing Tubman on the $20 bill is counterproductive because it covers up Tubman's history of activism. Jones wrote, "Her legacy is rooted in resisting the foundation of American capitalism."

Reclaiming Our Space 
In 2019, Jones published Reclaiming Our Space: How Black Feminism is Changing the World from the Tweets to the Streets. The book explores how Black feminism has evolved through the use of social media and includes autobiographical segments, analyses of Twitter and hashtag movements that were inspired by Black women, and interviews with public figures and activists such as CaShawn Thompson and Glynda Carr.

Publishers Weekly wrote that Feminista Jones "astutely analyzes the nuances of black female identity." Kirkus Reviews described the book as: "Sharp and provocative, the narrative is most powerful in its implication that, unless born to privilege, all Americans, regardless of race or gender, now 'feel something akin to what Black people ... have always experienced.' Understanding black (female) struggles are therefore critical for everyone."

Works

Personal life 
Jones is pansexual. She is divorced and has one son.

Accolades 

 "Black Weblog Award" for Outstanding Online Activism (2014)
 The Root, Top 100 Black Social Influencers (2014)
 She Knows/Blog Her, "Voices of the Year" (2015)
 Philadelphia magazine, "The 100 Most Influential Philadelphians" (2018)

References

External links 

 

Living people
African-American feminists
American feminists
African-American activists
1979 births
Black Twitter
African-American women writers
American LGBT writers
Pansexual women
Writers from New York City
LGBT African Americans
Pseudonymous women writers
21st-century pseudonymous writers
21st-century African-American people
21st-century African-American women
20th-century African-American people
20th-century African-American women